Edineț is a district in the north-west of Moldova, with the administrative center at Edineț.
The other major city is Cupcini. As of 1 January 2011, its population was 82,900.

Geography

The district is bordered by Briceni District to the north, Ocnița District to the northeast, Dondușeni District to the east, Rîșcani District to the south, and Romania to the west across the Prut river. Most important rivers crossing the district are: Ciuhur (90 km), Racovăț (68 km) and Draghiște (67 km) the latter being the main Racovăț's tributary. All rivers of district flowing into the Prut.
The Moldavian Plateau occupies the majority district territory. It has a flat relief and less fragmented. Highest point of Edineț District is located near the village Clișcăuți in northeast of district, reaching 275 meters.

In the central western part of district covers a strip of coral, which called toltre. They are composed of limestone organogenous formed on the bottom of former Sarmatian sea having an age of 15–20 million years. In now coming to the surface like massive reefs with maximum height of 80–100 meters. In these rocks are many caves that served as shelter for Stone Age man.

Fauna 
The fauna is characteristic of both Eastern Europe and the central ones is represented by: fox, deer, boar, raccoon dog, ferret, rabbit. Rarely marten, wolf, wild cat.
Of birds: woodpecker, tit, cuckoo, starling, sparrow. Rarely quail, partridges and marsh hawk.

Flora 
Forests occupy 8.5% of the district territory and is characterized by common oak, chestnut, maple, ash, wild cherry. Of plants can include fescue, sedge, ramsons, singer.

Resources 
District has no natural resources except against Internet national silurene shale and sandstone complex disaggregated. Here is a compact shale industry amber. Also here are represented by limestone silica.

Climate 
District as northern Moldova has a temperate continental climate with an annual temperature of 8–9 C, the average temperature in July is 20.5 C and −5 C in average annual wind January. In some years rainfall reached 850 mm causing damages, while in other years rainfall 300 mm fail causing droughts. Yearly precipitation is 550–750 mm. Average wind speed of the district is 3–5 m\s.

Protected areas 

Brînzeni Reefs and Caves
Buzdugeni Gorge
Burlănești Gorge
Fetești Landscape Reserve
La Castel Landscape Reserve
Trinca Gorge
Zabriceni reserve

Administrative subdivisions
Localities: 49
Administrative Center: Edineț
Cities: Cupcini, Edineț
Villages: 17
Common: 30

Demographics
1 January 2012 the district population was 82,500 of which 31.5% urban and 68.5% rural population.

Births (2010): 888 (10.7 per 1000)
Deaths (2010): 1345 (16.2 per 1000)
Growth rate (2010): -457 (−5.5 per 1000)

Ethnic groups 

Footnote: * There is an ongoing controversy regarding the ethnic identification of Moldovans and Romanians.

Religion 
Christians 91.0%
Orthodox Christians – 87.5%
Protestant – 3.3%
Seventh-day Adventists – 1.1%
Pentecostal – 1.1%
Evangelicals – 0.7%
Baptists – 0.4%
Old Believers – 0.2%
Other – 7.3%
No Religion – 1.5%
Atheists – 0.2%

Economy

Edineț district in Moldova's National Development Complex, is presented as an agrarian-industrial district. Agricultural area is 74 556 ha of the district. Economy, agriculture, industry on the district (as at 01/10/06) 20,946 active traders (in the same period of 2005–2012). Industrial output in the previous year's average prices, manufactured by enterprises of all types of property in the territory in 2005, was 377,41 mill. lei or 135 percent from 2004. The volume index of industrial production in current prices compared with the previous year, accounted for 131.1%. If in 2004 there was industrial production value of 236,89 mill. lei in 2005 production volume reached EUR 310,623 mill. lei, or 73 million lei more than 734,000. The total volume of industrial production, manufacturing and return them 99%. Main enterprises are Cupcini-Cristal, InLac, Tipografia, Natur-Bravo, Astra, Apromaș and others.

Agriculture 

Agriculture is the main branch in the district economy.
In 2005 the overall volume of agricultural production in all categories of households in comparable prices, was 378.3 mill. lei, exceeding the previous year by 28.3 million or 8%, and compared to 2000 production agriculture increased by 18.5%. In 2005 agricultural production (current prices) amounted to 415.1 mill. lei, which showed an increase of 8.6% over the previous year and compared to 2000 – by 24.5%. The agricultural production structure has the dominant position in crop production – 75.1% (which is more by 14% as in 2000), in 2005 obtained a harvest of cereals and legumes with a quantity of 108235 tons, achieving a yoy increase of 18.4 thousand tons, or 20.4% more. Average yield per hectare was winter wheat – 35 quintals, barley – 31 quintals, peas – 22 quintals, corn – 30 quintals. A significant revival attesting to increase the volume of production which increased compared to previous year 5850 tons or more, and average productivity per hectare was 19 to 15 quintals in 2004. Similarly, increased by 8.7% potato and vegetables by 11.3%.

Transportation
In district are open 53 regular passenger routes, of which 9 – Chișinău, 15 – interdistrict, 3 – International (Moscow, St. Petersburg, Botoșani), 26 – rural (includes all localities in the district). Maintenance have been met roads the local district funded. Of the total planned maintenance and repair of 493,3 thousands lei roads this chapter have been assessed 493,3 thousands, of which 160,7 thousands lei were used to maintain winter 2005.

Politics

As in other districts of "North Red" Communist Party dominates politics in 2001 when the Communists gather over 50%. But in the last two years the Communists are in a continuous decrease in the 2010 adding together 52.52% of votes.

While the AEI during the last three elections has increased the result by 55.7%.

Elections 

|-
!style="background-color:#E9E9E9" align=center colspan="2" valign=center|Parties and coalitions
!style="background-color:#E9E9E9" align=right|Votes
!style="background-color:#E9E9E9" align=right|%
!style="background-color:#E9E9E9" align=right|+/−
|-
| 
|align=left|Party of Communists of the Republic of Moldova
|align="right"|20,561
|align="right"|52.52
|align="right"|−4.77
|-
| 
|align=left|Democratic Party of Moldova
|align="right"|8,459
|align="right"|21,61
|align="right"|+3.27
|-
| 
|align=left|Liberal Democratic Party of Moldova
|align="right"|5,017
|align="right"|12.81
|align="right"|+4.66
|-
| 
|align=left|Party Alliance Our Moldova
|align="right"|1,459
|align="right"|3.73
|align="right"|−3.25
|-
| 
|align=left|Liberal Party
|align="right"|1,456
|align="right"|3.72
|align="right"|−1.10
|-
|bgcolor=#0033cc|
|align=left|European Action Movement
|align="right"|618
|align="right"|1.58
|align="right"|+1.58
|-
|bgcolor="grey"|
|align=left|Other Party
|align="right"|1,593
|align="right"|4.03
|align="right"|-0.39
|-
|align=left style="background-color:#E9E9E9" colspan="2"|Total (turnout 61.04%)
|width="30" align="right" style="background-color:#E9E9E9"|39,529
|width="30" align="right" style="background-color:#E9E9E9"|100.00
|width="30" align="right" style="background-color:#E9E9E9"|

Educations
The district operates 38 kindergartens and 44 undergraduate institutions, of which 8 schools, 8 middle schools, 28 secondary schools. In pre-school children to educate 3008, which is 61.2%, in 4815 the number of preschool children in the district. Also, preparatory working group 38 with a contingent of 835 children. In schools in the district are studying 10,777 students are all enrolled. The system of secondary education teachers working in 1040, including 119 retirees, young professionals were hired in July. Young professionals have benefited from facilities provided by law. Teaching is provided to cover all disciplines of education in the Plan of Ministry of Education, Youth and Sports. Continue implementation of the presidential program "SALT".

Culture

The successes enjoyed by district librarians, organizing poetry recitals, discussions of books, contests. Each library is organized book exhibitions. Annual district participate in the Republican "the sources of wisdom." In the three schools of arts education teaches children and 342 teachers are employed 37. Many graduates continue their studies at colleges and degree in music. Some students from the School of Fine Arts in Edineț, participating in international exhibitions with medals and awards are relaxed. Conditions are satisfactory school activity. The museum enjoys great popularity in his native land with sections Edineț history, folk art, nature. Currently the museum has 24,500 artifacts. Regular visitors are children in kindergartens, schools district students and even visitors from the republic and other countries.

Health
The district operates 14 health center, 21 offices of family doctors, 8 medical centers, a hospital district. During 2005, 10,976 people received treatment, including 10 209 patients were hospitalized. Drugs were issued in the amount of 1,923,500 lei. Number of visits by patients to family doctors centers is 253,662, of which – 227,994 visits to district clinic. Of the total population of 84,720 people have insurance policies 59,456 people required medical assistance. Improving socio-economic situation in recent years has had a positive influence on health status and medical basic demographic indicators. Thus, in 2010 888 children were born. But unfortunately the negative natural increase: births is 10.7% (1,000 people) and 16.2% mortality.

Personalities
Anatoliy Kinakh – Politician, Prime minister of Ukraine in 2001–2002
Ghenadie Ciobanu – Politician (PLDM), Member of the Parliament of Moldova since 2010
Ion Morei – Minister of Justice of the Republic of Moldova in 2001–2003
Samuel Wainer – Brazilian journalist and author
Serafim Saca – Writer
Vasile Stroescu – Politician, Philanthropist and honorary member of the Romanian Academy
Victor Teleuca – Poet, essayist, translator and publicist

See also
 Edineț County

References

 
Districts of Moldova